Augspurger Grist Mill is a registered historic building in Woodsdale, Butler County, Ohio, listed in the National Register on 1984-11-01.

It was a three-story building with a full basement floor built into a bank.  It is vernacular in style but with Italianate influences.  Its gable end facade features  brick pilasters dividing it into three bays, and doorways to permit grain loading in the central bay of each level.  The grist mill was part of a company town of the Augspurger Paper Company.

Based on a photo of the site, it appears to have been demolished by 2012.

References

External links
Ohio Historic Inventory

National Register of Historic Places in Butler County, Ohio
Grinding mills on the National Register of Historic Places in Ohio
Grinding mills in Ohio